The 1971 Cupa României Final was the 33rd final of Romania's most prestigious football cup competition. It was disputed between Steaua București and Dinamo București, and was won by Steaua București after a game with 5 goals. It was the 11th cup for Steaua București.

Match details

See also 
List of Cupa României finals

References

External links
Romaniansoccer.ro

1971
Cupa
Romania
1971 Cupa Romaniei
FC Steaua București matches